Bert Zuurman (born 16 March 1973) is a Dutch former football striker, who made his professional debut in the 1990–1991 season for FC Groningen. Later on he played for Heracles Almelo, SC Heerenveen, BV Veendam, FC Eindhoven, FC Emmen, FC Zwolle, and TOP Oss.

Career
Born in Winschoten, Groningen, Zuurman played professional football with SC Heerenveen, before spending four seasons with FC Zwolle. Zuurman is a former U19 national player of The Netherlands. Zuurman holds a UEFA 'A' Licence.

After retiring from playing football, Zuurman became a manager and was appointed coach of FC Zwolle's women's team in 2010.

Zuurman is now in India and is the coach of the Ozone Football Academy in Bangalore, India. Zuurman  is the Head coach and Technical Director of Ozone FC, Bengaluru. OzoneFA, Bangalore runs a residential football academy and also their professional team, Ozone Footbal Club (Ozone FC, Bengaluru) now trains at the Bangalore Football Stadium; a stadium owned by the Karnataka State Football Association. Incidentally, the stadium also houses one of the four centres funded by the FIFA for the growth of youth football in India. The other centres are in Goa, West Bengal and Navi Mumbai.

Statistics

Managerial statistics
.

Honours
FC Zwolle
Eerste Divisie: 2001–02

References

External links
  Profile
 Bert Zuurman Interview

1973 births
Living people
Dutch footballers
Association football forwards
FC Groningen players
Heracles Almelo players
SC Heerenveen players
SC Veendam players
FC Eindhoven players
FC Emmen players
PEC Zwolle players
TOP Oss players
Eredivisie players
Eerste Divisie players
People from Winschoten
Footballers from Groningen (province)